This article provides a list of Pacifica Radio owned and operated stations, associated stations, and affiliate stations.

Radio Stations

Pacifica Stations

Affiliates

Western U.S. Affiliate Stations

Eastern U.S. Affiliate Stations

International Affiliate Stations  

1KPFB rebroadcasts KPFA for 99% of its schedule. 
2KMUE and KLAI rebroadcast KMUD full-time.
3KAQA rebroadcasts KKCR full-time.
4KZYZ rebroadcasts KZYX full-time.
5WGDH rebroadcasts WGDR.
6KTCB rebroadcasts KMUN full time.

FM Translator stations

1Note: K204AE is owned by a community organization, but rebroadcasts an owned & operated station.

2Associate Station KFCF rebroadcasts KPFA for 85% of its schedule.

Other Services

See also

List of community radio stations in the United States

References

External links
 Pacifica Network
 map of Pacifica Network

Pacifica Foundation
Pacifica
Pacifica, list
Pacifica, list